Homokmégy is a  village and municipality in Bács-Kiskun county, in the Southern Great Plain region of southern Hungary.

Village history

Őrjeg raised from a one-time branch of river Danube (Sár, Turján, Red marsh) as a boundary of eastern land created a closed area, which probably is the same as 'Big Island' written by Anonymous and stayed by princely dynasty.

Water-shaped characteristic of this area was considerably changed by protections against floods lasting since the beginning of the last century. Nowadays only geographical names of the village boundary remind us of the old water world. Mostly we can see tillages besides the peatery, meadows and pastures everywhere.

In 1877, Roman Catholic presbytery was founded, and its register of birth has been guided since 1877. In 1878, the new church was consecrated in honour of St. Adalbert.
In 1938, Gyula László excavated a cemetery from Avar age in Halom. The material of this excavation was preserved in the Hungarian National Museum. 
After 1945, the infrastructure of the village improved a lot (electricity, kindergarten, library, flats, artesian well, and groceries).
From 1954 till 1973, several folk music researchers and collectors visited the village.
In 1963, one of collection point of the Hungarian Ethnographical Atlas was Homokmégy.
In 1996, tombs from the 10th-11th century were dug beside the Alsómégy-Homokmégy dirt road. Őrjeg - with its peateries, pastures, grasslands almost on 1000 - was pronounced a nature conservation area in 1997.

The domestic industry of embroidery of this place is considerable; birthplace of famous egg-painter, embroiderer women, is Homokmégy. Recently, hunting tourism becomes more substantial in village life.

Geography
It covers an area of 70.33 km² and has a population of 1544 people (2002).

Sister village
  Vărşag (Romania)

External links
 Homokmégy Portál
 English – Deutsch – Italiano – Français

Populated places in Bács-Kiskun County